Cauê Santos da Mata, or simply Cauê (born 1 May 1986), is a Brazilian football (soccer) midfielder. He currently plays the "Campeonato Gaúcho" for "São José de Porto Alegre" and has previously played for other clubs in Brazil, Japan and USA. He also played for the Brazil national U-17 team.

Club statistics

Honours 
J2 League (2007)

External links

 Cauê Santos da Mata at the Brazilian FA database

1986 births
Living people
Brazilian footballers
Brazilian expatriate footballers
Brazil youth international footballers
Esporte Clube Vitória players
Hokkaido Consadole Sapporo players
Expatriate footballers in Japan
Expatriate soccer players in the United States
J2 League players
USL First Division players
Miami FC (2006) players
Association football midfielders
Sportspeople from Salvador, Bahia